Bernard P. Gould (second ¼ 1893 – death unknown) was a Welsh professional rugby league footballer who played in the 1920s.

Background
He was married to Norah Winifred Mahoney, who worked as a bookkeeper for the Cunard Lines, and they fathered two sons, Bernard and Stanley, both of whom are deceased (in the 1970s).

Playing career

International honours
Bernard Gould won 3 caps for Wales in 1921–1923 while at Leeds and Wakefield Trinity, and won a cap for Other Nationalities while at Leeds.

County Cup Final appearances
Bernard Gould played  left-, i.e. number 8, in Leeds' 11-3 victory over Dewsbury in the 1921–22 Yorkshire County Cup Final during the 1921–22 season at Thrum Hall, Halifax on Saturday 26 November 1921, and played left-. i.e. number 8, in Wakefield Trinity's 9-8 victory over Batley in the 1924–25 Yorkshire County Cup Final during the 1924–25 season at Headingley Rugby Stadium, Leeds on Saturday 22 November 1924.

Club career
Bernard Gould  made his début for Wakefield Trinity during February 1922, he appears to have scored no drop-goals (or field-goals as they are currently known in Australasia), but prior to the 1974–75 season all goals, whether; conversions, penalties, or drop-goals, scored 2-points, consequently prior to this date drop-goals were often not explicitly documented, therefore '0' drop-goals may indicate drop-goals not recorded, rather than no drop-goals scored. In addition, prior to the 1949–50 season, the archaic field-goal was also still a valid means of scoring points.

References

1893 births
British publicans
Leeds Rhinos players
Other Nationalities rugby league team players
Place of death missing
Rugby league hookers
Rugby league players from the Vale of Glamorgan
Rugby league props
Sportspeople from Penarth
Wakefield Trinity players
Wales national rugby league team players
Welsh rugby league players
Year of death missing